Utd. State 90 is an album by the English electronic group 808 State. It was released on 1 June 1990 by Tommy Boy Records, Warner Bros. Records and ZTT Records. It is the group's US version of the Ninety album, and it features unique cover art and a longer, revised track listing.

Track listing
 "Pacific 202"
 "Boneyween"
 "Ancodia"
 "Kinky National"
 "Cobra Bora"
 "Cubik"
 "Magical Dream"
 "808080808"
 "Revenge of the Girlie Men"
 "Donkey Doctor"
 "Sunrise"
 "State to State"
 "Pacific 212"
 "Pacific 718"

References

1990 albums
808 State albums
Tommy Boy Records albums